Admiral Sir Randolph Stewart Gresham Nicholson,  (16 December 1892 – 28 July 1975) was a Royal Navy officer who became Lieutenant-Governor of Jersey.

Naval career
Nicolson served in the First World War with the Harwich Force and took part in the Zeebrugge and Ostend Raids in 1918. After the war he joined the staff at the Royal Navy College, Dartmouth and then became Aide-de-camp to the Governor of Malaya and the Straits Settlements. Under Nicholson's command the Somali took possession of the Hannah Böge, the first prize of the Second World War at sea, just two hours into the war. He continued his war service as Commodore-in-Command, Royal Naval Barracks, Chatham from November 1940 to August 1943 and then appointed as Flag Officer, Ceylon from August 1943 to April 1944. He was then appointed Flag Officer, Ceylon and Deputy Commander-in-Chief of the Eastern Fleet until July 1945. After the war he became Admiral-Superintendent, Devonport until he retired in 1950.

In retirement he was Lieutenant-Governor of Jersey. There is a memorial to him in Holy Trinity Church, Rudgwick.

References

1892 births
1975 deaths
Knights Commander of the Order of the British Empire
Companions of the Order of the Bath
Companions of the Distinguished Service Order
Recipients of the Distinguished Service Cross (United Kingdom)
Royal Navy officers of World War I
Royal Navy admirals of World War II
Governors of Jersey